Mount Michelson is a mountain at the head of the Meares Glacier,  NW of Valdez in the Chugach Mountains of Alaska, USA. The mountain was named around 1957 for Albert Abraham Michelson by members of the Chugach Mountains Expedition sponsored by the Arctic Institute of North America.

References

Michelson
Landforms of Chugach Census Area, Alaska
Michelson